Trastámara may refer to:
the land "beyond (north of) the Tambre" (tras Támara) in medieval Galicia
Count of Trastámara, a medieval title of nobility
House of Trastámara, a late medieval Spanish dynasty